Orisadipe Obasa, M.D. (January 1863 – 15 April 1940) was a Nigerian doctor and prince who played a significant role in the politics of Lagos in the first decades of the 20th century.

Early years

Orisadipe Obasa was born in January 1863 in Freetown, Sierra Leone, into an aristocratic Saro family.
His paternal grandfather was the Oba Elekole of Ikole, Ekiti, and his mother was from the Abeokuta royal family of the Akija of Ikija.
As a youth, Obasa moved to Lagos. In 1878, he was admitted as Senior Foundation Scholar to the newly opened Wesleyan Boys High School (now Methodist Boys High School, Lagos) where he excelled academically. He eventually served as first President of the Old Boys Association of his high school.

In 1883, his parents sent him to England to study medicine. He used the name George Stone Smith while in England. He was admitted to King's College, Taunton, where he again was a star pupil, and went on to St Thomas's Hospital Medical School in London. He graduated in 1891 with Membership of the Royal College of Surgeons and the Licentiate of the Royal College of Physicians.

Career

In 1892, Obasa returned to Lagos and began a private medical practice. 
During the Anglo-Ashanti wars, towards the end of the 19th century, he served in an expedition of the Lagos Constabulary in the Gold Coast colony.
He was awarded a medal for his services, and in 1900, was appointed Assistant Colonial Surgeon in the Lagos medical service.
He played an important role in public health campaigns in the Lagos Colony and the interior of southern Nigeria.

Personal life and politics
In 1902, Obasa married Charlotte Olajumoke,  daughter of the wealthy merchant Richard Beale Blaize, and was given a comfortable house as a wedding present. In 1903, he visited Ekiti during Governor William MacGregor's smallpox vaccination program.
He made useful medical observations on subjects such as yaws, hookworm and inguinal hernias.

In 1904, Obasa resigned from his position as colonial surgeon so he could spend more time at home.
He resumed his private practice and also plunged into politics.
He was fluent in speech and writing, at ease with others, and had good family connections.
In 1908, Obasa and Dr. John K. Randle founded the People's Union to agitate against the proposed water rates, which was the first political organisation in Nigeria.
Obasa was secretary of the Union, while Randle was president.
In 1911, Randle and Obasa seem to have travelled to London to make the case against Governor Frederick Lugard's proposal to declare that all lands were government property.
The Union continued to oppose the new water rates until yielding in 1916.
The People's Union and its leaders lost favour with the electorate thereafter.
However, Obasa was nominated in 1921 to the Nigerian Legislative Council, where he was active on various committees.

At the time when the Nigerian National Democratic Party was founded in 1922 by Herbert Macaulay, 
the leaders of the People's Union were Randle, Obasa, Sir Kitoye Ajasa, Richard Akinwande Savage and Sir Adeyemo Alakija.

Obasa's wife led the Women's Union. Both Unions favoured a measured approach to reforms. They could not compete with NNDP. In September 1923, the first elections were held for the Legislative Council. Obasa ran but was defeated. Randle died in 1928 and Obasa took leadership of what was left of the People's Union.

At the time of the founding of the Reformed Ogboni Fraternity, he served as its inaugural Oluwo (or master). His wife, Charlotte, was at the same time made the Iya Abiye (or lady master) of the same group. They both led the nascent fraternity until their deaths.

Obasa contracted Parkinson's disease in 1926. As the disease progressed, he was increasingly incapacitated. He died, aged 77, in April 1940, at his Lagos home.

References

Sources

 
 
 
 
 

1863 births
1940 deaths
19th-century Nigerian medical doctors
Yoruba physicians
Yoruba politicians
20th-century Nigerian politicians
Sierra Leonean people of Yoruba descent
Sierra Leonean emigrants to Nigeria
People from colonial Nigeria
History of Lagos
Yoruba princes
People from Freetown
Neurological disease deaths in Nigeria
Deaths from Parkinson's disease
People educated at King's College, Taunton
20th-century Nigerian medical doctors
Physicians from Lagos
Saro people
Alumni of St Thomas's Hospital Medical School
Nigerian princes
Methodist Boys' High School alumni
Esotericists